Selina is a feminine given name, considered either a variant of Selene, the goddess and personification of the Moon in Greek mythology and religion, or a spelling variation of the name Celina, which is derived from the Roman name Cecilia, referring to a woman from the Caecilia gens. This spelling variant had begun to be used in the United Kingdom by the 1600s.

People
 Selina Büchel (born 1991), Swiss middle-distance runner
 Selina Chow (born 1945), Hong Kong politician and broadcaster
 Selina Cooper (1864–1946), English suffragist
 Selina Foote (born 1985), New Zealand artist
 Selina Gasparin (born 1984), Swiss biathlete
 Selina Griffiths (born 1969), British actress
 Selina Hastings, Countess of Huntingdon (1707–1791), English Christian revivalist, Methodist
 Selina Hastings (Lady Selina Shirley Hastings, born 1945), British biographer and journalist
 Selina Hornibrook (born 1978), Australian netball player
 Selina Hossain (born 1947), Bangladeshi novelist
 Selina Jen (born 1981), Taiwanese girl-band member
 Selina Jörg (born 1988), German snowboarder
 Selina Kuruleca, Fijian psychotherapist and commentator
 Selina Leem, Marshallese climate change activist and spoken word performer
 Selina Perera (1909-1986), Sri Lankan Sinhala Trotskyist
 Selina Robinson (born c. 1964), Canadian politician from British Columbia
 Selina Scott (born 1951), English newsreader, journalist, television producer and presenter
 Selina Siggins (1878–1964), Australian trade unionist and politician
 Selina Tusitala Marsh (born 1971), Pasifika poet-scholar 
 Selina Zumbühl (born 1983), Swiss football midfielder

Variants
A Spanish version of the name is Selena.
A Greek version of the name is Σελένα.
A French version of the name is Sélene.
A Hebrew version of the name is סלינה.
A Turkish version of the name is Selin.

Fictional characters
 Selina Peake De Jong, the protagonist of Edna Ferber's novel So Big
 Selina Kyle (disambiguation), alter ego of the original Catwoman, the DC Comics character
 Selina Meyer, protagonist of the HBO television comedy series Veep
 Selina Roberts, from the Australian soap opera Home and Away
 Selina, the main antagonist in the sixth season of Winx Club
 Selina Khan, main character from CBBC's Wolfblood
 Selina D'Arcey, main character from 1965 American film A Patch of Blue
 Selina Plymdale, a character in Middlemarch - a novel by English author George Eliot

Other
 Selina, a novel by German author Jean Paul, published posthumously in 1827
 Selina (1948), a ballet for Sadler's Wells, choreographed by Andrée Howard to music by Rossini.

See also 
Celina (disambiguation)
Céline (disambiguation)
Selene (disambiguation)
Selenia (moth), a genus of moths
Selena (disambiguation)
Tselina (disambiguation)
Selin (disambiguation)

Notes